Amar sin Límites (English: Limitless Love) is a Mexican telenovela produced by Angelli Nesma Medina for Televisa in 2006. This limited-run serial is a remake of the 2003 Argentine telenovela Resistiré; it is the first such remake, as a second adaptation, Watch Over Me, was created for MyNetworkTV in the United States and debuted in December 2006.

On Monday, October 16, 2006, Canal de las Estrellas started broadcasting Amar sin límites weekdays at 7:30pm, replacing Duelo de pasiones. The last episode was broadcast on Friday, April 20, 2007 with Muchachitas como tú replacing it the following day.

Karyme Lozano and Valentino Lanús starred as protagonists, while René Strickler, Sabine Moussier, Alma Muriel and Mónika Sánchez starred as antagonists.

Cast

Main
Karyme Lozano as Azul Toscano/Azucena
Valentino Lanús as Diego Morán Huerta
René Strickler as Mauricio Duarte
Mónika Sánchez as Silvana Lombardo
María Sorté as Clemencia Huerta de Morán
Otto Sirgo as Alfredo Toscano
José Carlos Ruiz as Don Aurelio Huerta
Alma Muriel as Leonarda Galván
Sabine Moussier as Eva Santoro

Supporting
 
Isaura Espinoza as Isela
Lourdes Munguía as Emilia
Socorro Bonilla as Gloria Provenzano
Luis Bayardo as Don Jesús "Chucho" Rivera
Diana Golden as Inés Menzur
Juan Carlos Serrán as Aníbal Menéndez
Marco Muñoz as Manuel Morán
Eduardo Liñán as Román Pérez Castelar
Luis Xavier as Julio Corso
Arsenio Campos as Leandro Burgay
Jaime Lozano as Efraín García
Alejandro Ruiz as Gustavo "Tavo" Lara
Patsy as Liliana de Duarte
Carmen Becerra as Lidia Morán Huerta
Manuela Ímaz as Cecilia Galindo
Jorge de Silva as Arnaldo Toscano
Lisardo as Piero Escobar
Estrella Lugo as Lucía
Marcelo Córdoba as Andrés Galván
Óscar Ferretti as Gaspar García
Rafael del Villar as Iván
Mariana Beyer as Caty Duarte
Julio Camejo as Paco
Agustín Arana as Luis Felipe Peña
Alejandro Ávila as Mario López
Myrrah Saavedra as Magda de Peña
Lupita Lara as Madre María
Alejandro Correa as Frijolito
Ernesto Faxas as Flavio
Adriano Zendejas as Dieguito Morán Toscano
Ricardo Franco as Dr. Linares

Awards

References

External links

 at esmas.com 

2006 telenovelas
Mexican telenovelas
2006 Mexican television series debuts
2007 Mexican television series endings
Television shows set in Mexico City
Televisa telenovelas
Mexican television series based on Argentine television series
Spanish-language telenovelas